The 1998 Tickford 500 was an endurance motor race for V8 Supercars. The event, which was the 33rd running of the Sandown 500, was held on 13 September 1998 at the Sandown International Motor Raceway. The race was won by Larry Perkins and Russell Ingall driving a Perkins Engineering Holden VT Commodore.

Class Structure
While still following long-term plans to abandon class structures within V8 Supercar, a class was instigated for the 1998 Tickford 500 and FAI 1000 Classic endurance races allowing smaller teams to save considerable budget by running a Dunlop control tyre, indicated here by CT. Most teams, particularly the professional teams, preferred to race with freedom of tyre choice, indicated by the class OC.

Top Ten Shootout
The top ten cars from Qualifying contested a Top Ten Shootout to determine the first ten grid positions for the race. Shootout results were as follows:

Official results
Race results were as follows:

Note: The race was scheduled to be run over 161 laps, however the slower lap times dictated by the wet weather conditions resulted in the race being shortened after reaching its three-hour-45-minute time limit.

Statistics
 Provisional pole position (qualifying) - #1 Mark Skaife - 1:11.9148
 Pole position (Top Ten Shootout) - #50 Greg Murphy - 1:22.3834
 Fastest race lap - #4 Jason Bright - 1:13.2534 (152 km/h)
 Winners' race time - 03:45:09.5507 
 Race average speed - 121 km/h

References

Further reading

External links
 Official race results
 Official V8 Supercar website
 Thumbnail race images at web.archive.org
 1998 Sandown 500 - Full Race video at www.youtube.com

Tickford 500
Motorsport at Sandown
Pre-Bathurst 500
September 1998 sports events in Australia